Across the Pacific is a lost 1926 American silent romantic adventure film produced by Warner Bros., directed by Roy del Ruth and starring Monte Blue. It was based on a 1900 play by Charles Blaney and J. J. McCloskey. The play had been filmed before in 1914 with Dorothy Dalton. It is unknown, but the film might have been released with a Vitaphone soundtrack.

Plot
After his father brings disgrace on his family, Monte joins the Spanish–American War (April–August 1898) and goes with his regiment to the Philippines. Although he has a sweetheart back home, Claire Marsh, he is enlisted to romance a mixed race girl, Roma, who knows the whereabouts of the Philippine leader Emilio Aguinaldo. Monte must keep up the ruse even when Claire comes to the islands to visit him. He finally gets the information that he needs but not before he is branded a deserter and then must prove his mettle on the battlefield. When the insurrection is squelched and Aguinaldo is captured, Monte is able to explain everything to Claire, and the couple are reunited.

Cast
 Monte Blue as Monte
 Jane Winton as Claire Marsh
 Myrna Loy as Roma
 Charles Stevens as Emilio Aguinaldo
 Tom Wilson as Tom
 Walter McGrail as Captain Grover
 Herbert Prior as Colonel Marsh
 Edgar Kennedy as Corporal Ryan
 Theodore Lorch as Aguinaldo's Agent
 Abraham Jacob Hollandersky as old tough in bar scene

Box office
According to Warner Bros. records the film earned $252,000 domestically and $100,000 foreign.

See also
 List of early Warner Bros. sound and talking features

References

External links

 
 
 
 
 Lobby poster in French
 Lobby card
  (source material)

1926 films
1926 adventure films
1920s romance films
1926 war films
American adventure films
American black-and-white films
American films based on plays
American romance films
American silent feature films
American war films
Cultural depictions of Emilio Aguinaldo
Films directed by Roy Del Ruth
Films set during the Philippine–American War
Films set in the 1890s
Films set in the Philippines
Lost American films
Spanish–American War films
Warner Bros. films
1926 lost films
Lost adventure films
Lost romance films
Lost war films
1920s American films
Silent adventure films
1920s English-language films